Elkarrekin Podemos (Elkarrekin in Basque: "Together" or "United"; Podemos in Spanish: "We Can"; Elkarrekin Podemos translated in English as "United We Can") is a left-wing electoral alliance in the Basque Country formed by Podemos, Ezker Anitza and Equo in August 2016 ahead of the 2016 Basque regional election. The alliance was renewed ahead of the 2020 Basque regional election with the exclusion of Equo, after the party had broken up with the Unidas Podemos nationwide alliance to join Más País in the lead up to the November 2019 Spanish general election.

History
The coalition is based on the one formed for the 2016 Spanish general election, in which the Unidos Podemos/Elkarrekin Ahal Dugu coalition became the most voted force in the three Basque districts, also winning in number of seats. Given the coalition success, the three parties agreed to re-edit the coalition to contest the Basque election scheduled for September 25, 2016.

On 11 August 2016, the three formations ratified the agreement to go jointly to the polls under the Elkarrekin Podemos name. The chosen name is similar to that used for the general election, but instead of separating the Spanish and Basque denominations with a slash (Unidos Podemos/Elkarrekin Ahal Dugu), they chose to join the two denominations into one using a word of each language as a symbol of the linguistic richness of the Basque Country.

As candidate for lehendakari they chose Pilar Zabala, who had already been chosen by the bases of Podemos/Ahal Dugu in primary elections.

Composition

Electoral performance

Basque Parliament

Cortes Generales

European Parliament

Symbols

References

2016 establishments in the Basque Country (autonomous community)
Left-wing political party alliances
Podemos (Spanish political party)
Political parties established in 2016
Political parties in the Basque Country (autonomous community)
Political party alliances in Spain
Socialist parties in the Basque Country (autonomous community)
Basque Country
United Left (Spain)